The SIG Sauer M17 and M18 are service pistols derived from the SIG Sauer P320 in use with the United States Armed Forces. On January 19, 2017, the United States Army announced that a customized version of SIG Sauer's P320 had won the Army's XM17 Modular Handgun System competition. The full-sized model was designated the M17, and the shorter length carry model, the M18. The guns have subsequently been adopted by the Army, Navy, Marine Corps, Air Force, and Space Force. The pistol replaces the Beretta M9, as well as several other handguns across the services. There are two color variants, coyote brown and black, for both the M17 and M18, though almost all have been produced in brown.

Modular Handgun System competition

When the requirements were formulated for a new handgun for the U.S. Army, one of the tenets of the proposal was that an existing model handgun was desired to fulfill the requirements laid out in the Modular Handgun System Request for Proposal, known as the XM17 Procurement. SIG Sauer submitted a P320 with a number of modifications for the XM17 Modular Handgun System competition.

Modifications 
 Slide cut out to facilitate the addition of a reflex sight; this is the slide from the RX Series.
 Ambidextrous thumb safety.
 Loaded chamber indicator.
 Improved slide sub-assembly to capture small components when disassembled.
 Improved trigger "mud flap" to prevent foreign debris from entering the pistol action.
  barrel length in full-size M17.
  barrel length in carry-size M18.
 Chambered in 9mm NATO; unable to adopt other calibers or frames because of the spanner screw on the frame's chassis.
 A 17-round standard magazine, with an optional 21-round extended magazine available.
 Steel components are given a physical vapor deposition (PVD) corrosion-resistant finish.
 Using spanner screws instead of normal screws to resist disassembly further than field stripping by non-armorer users.

The Modular Handgun System has self-illuminating tritium sights for low-light conditions, an integrated rail for attaching enablers and an Army standard suppressor conversion kit for attaching an acoustic/flash suppressor. Every M17/M18 handgun is test fired before leaving the factory with 13 rounds -- three to break in the weapon and ten to test accuracy.

History

SIG Sauer wins the contract
On January 19, 2017, the United States Army announced that the SIG Sauer P320 MHS variant had won the military's Modular Handgun System trials. The modified P320 was subsequently designated the M17 (Full-Size) and M18 (Carry) for U.S. military service. The M17 has better accuracy and ergonomics and tighter dispersion than the Beretta M9 and will be fielded more widely, being issued down to squad and fireteam leaders. US special operations forces operators are all dual-armed with a pistol and a rifle. Junior leaders in regular infantry units who were previously excluded from carrying sidearms will be given more choices and options in close quarters battle situations under a new policy. All Army units are planned to have the M9 replaced with the M17 within a decade.

U.S. military services adopt the M17 and M18
In May 2017, the Army announced that the first unit that will receive the M17 would be the 101st Airborne Division by the end of the year. At the same time, the rest of the U.S. Armed Forces revealed they also intend to acquire the handgun, making it the standard sidearm for the entire U.S. military. The services plan to procure up to 421,000 weapons in total; 195,000 for the Army, 130,000 for the Air Force, 61,000 for the Navy (M18 compact version only), and 35,000 for the Marines.

In 2019, the Marine Corps selected the M18 to replace several pistols. While the other services had previously primarily fielded the Beretta M9 and M9A1, the Corps also planned to replace its M45A1 and M007 pistols with the M18. The M45A1 was made by Colt and the only recently fielded M007 was made by Glock. The Marines began rolling out the M18 in 2020.

Although it was initially announced that the U.S. Coast Guard would adopt the M17/18 handgun, the agency announced in September 2020 that they would acquire Glock 19 Gen 5 handguns through a DHS procurement. In November 2019, SIG Sauer announced the delivery of the 100,000th M17/M18 handgun to the U.S. military.

Ammunition 
Though the pistol remained chambered in 9mm NATO rather than a larger caliber, the contract allowed the Army and other services to procure SIG Sauer' s proposed XM1152 Full Metal Jacket and XM1153 Special Purpose ammunition. The ammunition is a "Winchester jacketed hollow-point" round; similar in appearance to the Winchester PDX1 round but with some differences to the design of the hollow-point petals. One round is a standard 115 grain ball, designated the M1152, the other is a 147 grain Special Purpose round designated the M1153. Olin Corporation (Winchester Brand) received a contract to produce approximately 1.2 million rounds of the ammunition.

Assessment recommendations
The first annual report for the XM17/XM18 Modular Handgun System (MHS) program assessment recommended the Army:
 Upon identification of the root cause of the double ejections and ball ammunition reliability problems, confirm fixes to both the XM17 and XM18 in future testing. 
 Work with the vendor to identify and eliminate cause of variability in the manufacture of the trigger group mechanism. 
 Consider redesign of the slide catch lever and other operator training changes to prevent engagement by operators while shooting the pistol.

Tomb of the Unknown Soldier pistols

On October 11, 2018, four ceremonial M17s built by Sig Sauer's Custom Shop were presented to The Old Guard for use by the Sentinels which guard the Tomb of the Unknown Soldier at Arlington National Cemetery. Each of the four pistols bears a specific name and theme engraved on the pistol's dust cover: Silence, Respect, Dignity, and Perseverance. "Silence" and "Respect", are highly polished with brown wood handgrips, used for daylight hours, while "Dignity" and "Perseverance" are matte black pistols with black wood handgrips for night duty and bouts of inclement weather. All four guns use an aluminum frame, rather than the polymer plastic of the standard M17, while the controls are the standard matte black. The rear slide cocking serrations of the regular M17 are replaced with "XXI", a reference to the twenty-one steps the guards take on their patrol in front of the tomb, as well as the 21-gun salute. Various materials of significance are incorporated into the pistol. The wood grips are crafted from wooden planks removed from the deck of the USS Olympia, the ship which carried the first Unknown Soldier to the United States in 1921. Marble dust from the tomb's restoration is also sealed in a glass vial and used in place of the front tritium sight. The M17s only have engravings in one area of the pistol, on the sight plate, which features an engraving of three Greek figures, Peace, Victory, and Valor.

Serial numbers
The pistols are serialized with a unique set of serial numbers that incorporate items of significance to the Old Guard: "LS" represents line six of the Sentinels' Creed, "My standard will remain perfection"; "02JUL37" to signify the first 24-hour guard posted at the Tomb of the Unknown on July 3, 1937; and "21" to signify the 21 steps it takes the Tomb Sentinels to walk by the Tomb of the Unknown and the military honor of a 21 Gun Salute.

Magazines
Tomb Sentinels carry loaded weapons, with the 21-round magazine inserted into the pistol. The magazines are customized, and feature an aluminum base plate engraved with the names of the Greek figures featured on the Tomb of the Unknown – Peace, Victory, and Valor – and include a name plate on the bottom of the magazine engraved with the Tomb Sentinel badge number.

SIG Sauer P320-M17 and P320-M18

In 2018, SIG Sauer released a civilian market variant of the handgun called the P320-M17. The firearm is nearly identical, albeit lacking the tamper resistant takedown screws, and available with or without an external manual safety. The P320-M17 stainless steel slide is PVD coated and the control elements feature a black finish like found on later military M17 service pistol batches. A commemorative edition was also released, called simply the M17 Commemorative, produced in the exact specification of the original gun delivered to the army, including brown trigger and controls, the same choice of magazines selected by the military, and delivered in a plain cardboard box rather than the normal SIG Sauer hard sided black plastic case, just as military pistols were packaged. Production of the M17 Commemorative was limited to a run of 5,000 units. 

In 2020, SIG released the P320-M18, which features the same adaptation of the military configuration, this time with the shorter carry size M18.

Users

United States Army
United States Navy
United States Marine Corps
United States Air Force
United States Space Force

References

External links

 P320-M17 webpage
 US ARMY 101st AIRBORNE fire the M17 MHS (SIG SAUER P320) (Video)

9mm Parabellum semi-automatic pistols
SIG Sauer semi-automatic pistols
Modular firearms
Weapons and ammunition introduced in 2017
Semi-automatic pistols of the United States